The Gymnastics competitions in the 1965 Summer Universiade were held in Budapest, Hungary.

Men's events

Women's events

References
 Universiade gymnastics medalists on HickokSports

1965 in gymnastics
1965 Summer Universiade
Gymnastics at the Summer Universiade